Aisha Bowe is a Bahamian-American aerospace engineer, founder, and CEO of STEMBoard, a technology company.

Early life and education 
Bowe grew up in the United States in a working-class family. Her father immigrated from the Bahamas. Her father was a taxi driver in Ann Arbor, Michigan. Although her high school guidance counselor recommended that she become a cosmetologist, Bowe's father urged her to take a mathematics class at her local community college, which she quickly aced. This foundation in mathematics then allowed Bowe to transfer into engineering programs at the University of Michigan from Washtenaw Community College.

Bowe completed her undergraduate degree in aerospace engineering in 2008, and master's degree in space systems engineering in 2009, both at the University of Michigan. She has said she chose aerospace engineering because of an interest in science fiction. One of her graduate instructors, Thomas Zurbuchen, was working on the Mercury Messenger. She worked as an intern in the Ames Research Center in 2008, before joining as an Engineer.

Career 
Bowe worked in the Ames Research Center, in the Flight Trajectory Dynamics and Controls Branch of the Aviation Systems Division. In 2012 she received the National Society of Black Engineers award for Outstanding Technical Contribution for her paper "Evaluation of a Fuel Efficient Aircraft Maneuver for Conflict Resolution". She joined the AST Flight and Fluid Mechanics group in 2009, assisting in the development and of algorithms in support of Air Traffic Management. As a Bahamian-American, Bowe wants "to see more Bahamians in the science and technology field."

Whilst at NASA, she served as liaison to the Mathematics, Engineering, Science Achievement (MESA) Program. In this role, she mentored students, held interview workshops and led NASA site tours.

In 2019, Bowe visited Johannesburg, Bloemfontein, and Pretoria in South Africa for a series of invited talks from October 7–18 as part of the U.S. Speaker Program. She has also lectured in many other countries, including  Israel and Kuwait.

Bowe is a member of the National Society of Black Engineers and a certified Program Management Professional by PMI. She is also a certified SSI scuba diver who has now completed dives in South Africa, The Bahamas, California, and the Cayman Islands.

She is also a mountain climber and ascended Mount Kilimanjaro in 2016.

STEMBoard 
Aisha is founder and CEO of STEMBoard, a company that solves technology challenges for government and private-sector clients. STEMBoard is a Certified Economically Disadvantaged Women-Owned Small Business supported by the U.S. Women's Chamber of Commerce. They are working to close the educational achievement gap of minority ethnic groups, through STEM camps, partnerships with historically black colleges and universities and career opportunities for young people.

STEMBoard ranked 2,284 on Inc. Magazine's Inc. 5000 list of fastest growing private companies in 2020.

“LINGO” Coding Kit 
Aisha Bowe is the creator of the LINGO coding kit. The LINGO coding kit teaches hardware and software design. The lessons are self-paced. The kit has hardware, an instructional guide and instructional videos. The first kit is called "In the Driver’s Seat." In the Driver's Seat instructs how to create and code a back-up sensor for an autonomous car.

Published works 
Some of Bowe's selected publications are:

Media 
Articles
How This Former NASA Engineer Wants to Make STEM Youth Education More Accessible
The remote learning coding kit is encouraging black teens to get into STEM
Why a Rocket Scientist Quit NASA to Help Young Coders
Meet the former NASA engineer helping to send careers into orbit
Meet Aisha Bowe, the Rocket Scientist and Entrepreneur Committed to Mentoring Black Tech's Next Generation
STEM at home: University of Michigan alum creates learning kit during pandemic
These Black Founders Succeeded In Spite of Silicon Valley
Introducing Fast Government, an exploration of innovation and talent in public service
Aerospace Engineer Aisha Bowe Introduces At-Home Coding Kit
U-M Aerospace alumnus Aisha Bowe returns to her alma mater Pioneer High School for presentation and Q&A Panel

Talks
Nicole Riche's Pearl xChange (2016)
LCL Season 4 EP10: How To Overcome Self Doubt with Aisha Bowe & Gerard Adams
Aisha Bowe speaking at Platform Summit 2015
Black Women in History -  AMC Network NAACP PSA

Podcasts
Aisha Bowe: Rocket Science and Start-ups
Mentor Memos: Aisha Bowe and Claire Luce
Women in Business, Episode 3: Aisha Bowe, Startups Magazine: The Cereal Entrepreneur
Techstination STEMBoard Lingo CEO Aisha Bowe

Television
NASA Aerospace Engineer Empowers Unrepresented People To Pursue Engineering Careers. Apr 18, 2021. The Kelly Clarkson Show.
This Rocket Scientist Was Once Told She Wouldn’t Be Good At STEM, She Didn’t Let It Stop Her. Apr 12, 2021. Tamron Hall Show.
Mars Rover Landing. Feb 18, 2021. NBCLX.

Awards 
Bowe has been recognized for her contributions to engineering, diversity, and equal opportunity by the National Aeronautics and Space Administration, National Society of Black Engineers, and US Women's Chamber of Commerce. Some selected awards are as follows.

2020 Entrepreneur of the Year by the Black Data Processing Associates (BDPA) of Washington, D.C.
2020 - Outstanding Alumna Award, Department of Aerospace Engineering, University of Michigan
2020 - INC 5000 2020 List of Fastest Growing Companies
2015 - US Women's Chamber of Commerce “Emerging Star” Award
2014 - Silicon Valley's National Coalition of 100 Black Women's Women in Technology of the Year Award
2012 - NASA’s Engineering Honor Award
2012 - NASA Equal Employment Opportunity Medal

References

External links 
 Aisha Bowe personal website
 STEMboard official website
 STEMLingo

Bahamian educators
American aerospace engineers
Women aerospace engineers
American women engineers
21st-century women engineers
Women innovators
African-American computer scientists
American women computer scientists
American computer scientists
University of Michigan College of Engineering alumni
Businesspeople from Ann Arbor, Michigan
21st-century African-American people
21st-century African-American women
Living people
Year of birth missing (living people)